Metathesis (from Greek , from  "I put in a different order"; Latin: transpositio) is the transposition of sounds or syllables in a word or of words in a sentence. Most commonly, it refers to the interchange of two or more contiguous segments or syllables, known as adjacent metathesis or local metathesis:

 foliage > **foilage (adjacent segments)
 anemone > **anenome (adjacent syllables)
 cavalry > **calvary (codas of adjacent syllables)

Metathesis may also involve interchanging non-contiguous sounds, known as nonadjacent metathesis, long-distance metathesis, or hyperthesis, as shown in these examples of metathesis sound change from Latin to Spanish:

 Latin  > Spanish  "word"
 Latin  > Spanish  "miracle"
 Latin  > Spanish  "danger, peril"
 Latin  > Spanish  "crocodile" 
Many languages have words that show this phenomenon, and some even use it as a regular part of their grammar, such as Hebrew and Fur. The process of metathesis has altered the shape of many familiar words in English as well.

The original form before metathesis may be deduced from older forms of words in the language's lexicon or, if no forms are preserved, from phonological reconstruction. In some cases it is not possible to settle with certainty on the original version.

Rhetorical metathesis
Dionysius of Halicarnassus was a historian and scholar in rhetoric living in 1st century BC Greece. He analysed classical texts and applied several revisions to make them sound more eloquent. One of the methods he used was re-writing documents on a mainly grammatical level: changing word and sentence orders would make texts more fluent and "natural", he suggested. He called this way of re-writing metathesis.

Examples

American Sign Language
In ASL, several signs which have a pre-specified initial and final location (such as the signs RESTAURANT, PARENT, TWINS) can have the order of these two locations reversed in contexts which seem to be purely phonological. While not possible with all signs, this does happen with quite a few. For example, the sign DEAF, prototypically made with the "1" handshape making contact first with the cheek and then moving to contact the jaw (as in the sentence FATHER DEAF), can have these locations reversed if the preceding sign, when part of the same constituent, has a final location more proximal to the jaw (as in the sentence MOTHER DEAF). Both forms of the sign DEAF are acceptable to native signers. A proposed prerequisite for metathesis to apply in ASL is that both signs must be within the same region on the body. Constraints on the applications of metathesis in ASL has led to discussions that the phonology breaks down the body into regions distinct from settings.

Amharic
Amharic has a few minor patterns of metathesis, as shown by Wolf Leslau. All of these examples show a pair of consonants reversed so that the stop begins the next syllable.

Azerbaijani
Metathesis among neighbouring consonants happens very commonly in Azerbaijani:
  >  "bridge"
  >  "leaf"
  >  "soil"
  >  "smoke"

Danish
Some common nonstandard pronunciations of Danish words employ metathesis:

  >  "pictures"
  >  "through"

But metathesis has also historically changed some words:

  >  " (Christian) cross"

Egyptian Arabic
A common example of metathesis in Egyptian Arabic is when the order of the word's root consonants has changed.

 Classical Arabic  > Egyptian Arabic gōz "husband"
 Classical Arabic  > ma‘la’a "spoon"
 Persian zanjabil > Egyptian Arabic ganzabīl ~ zanzabīl "ginger"

The following examples of metathesis have been identified in Egyptian Arabic texts, but are not necessarily more common than their etymological spellings:

  >  "God curse!"
  >  "theatre troupe"
  >  "philosophy"
The following loanwords are also sometimes found with metathesis:
  >  "monologue"
  >  "hospital"
  >  "penalty" (in football)
The likely cause for metathesis in the word "hospital" is that the result resembles a common word pattern familiar to Arabic speakers (namely a Form X verbal noun).

Perhaps the clearest example of metathesis in Egyptian Arabic is the modern name of the city of Alexandria:Iskandariya. In addition to the metathesis of x /ks/ to /sk/, the initial Al of Alexandria has been reanalyzed as the Arabic definite article.

English
Metathesis is responsible for some common speech errors, such as children acquiring spaghetti as pasketti. The word ask has the nonstandard variant ax pronounced ; the spelling ask is found in Shakespeare and in the King James Bible and ax in Chaucer, Caxton, and the Coverdale Bible. The word "ask" derives from Proto-Germanic *aiskōną.

Some other frequent English pronunciations that display metathesis are:

 aforementioned > afrementioned 
 nuclear > nucular  (re-analysed as nuke + -cular suffix in molecular, binocular)
 prescription > perscription 
 introduce > interduce 
 asterisk > asterix 
 comfortable > comfturble  (or kʌmf + tbl with an intrusive grunt resembling u before bl)
 cavalry > calvary 
 foliage > foilage 
 pretty > purty 

The process has shaped many English words historically.

The Old English  "three" formed  "thrid" and þrēotene "thriteen".

The Old English verb  "to work" had the passive participle  "worked".

The Old English  "hole" underwent metathesis to þryl. This gave rise to a verb  "pierce", which became Modern English , and formed the compound  "nose-hole" which became Modern English  (May have occurred in the early Middle English Period: "nosþyrlu" ( 1050); "nos-thirlys" ( 1500). In 1565 "nosthrille" appears; "thirl"/"thurl" survived even longer, until 1878).

Metathesis is also a common feature of the West Country dialects.

Finnish
In western dialects of Finnish, historical stem-final /h/ has been subject to metathesis (it is lost in standard Finnish). That leads to variant word forms:

  "stallion" (standard * > )
  "smoke" (standard * > )
  "lie" (standard * > )
  "boat" (standard * > )

Some words have been standardized in the metathetized form:

 * >  "sorrow"
 * >  "family"
 * >  "hero"
 * >  "untrue"

French
Etymological metathesis occurs in the following French words:

  from popular Latin berbex meaning "sheep" (early 12th century).
  from popular Latin formaticus, meaning "formed in a mold" (1135).
  (1654) from French mousquitte (1603) by metathesis. From Spanish mosquito ("little fly").

Deliberate metathesis also occurs extensively in the informal French pattern of speech called verlan (itself an example:  < , meaning "the reverse" or "the inverse"). In verlan new words are created from existing words by reversing the order of syllables. Verlanization is applied mostly to two-syllable words and the new words that are created are typically considerably less formal than the originals, and/or take on a slightly different meaning. The process often involves considerably more changes than simple metathesis of two phonemes but this forms the basis for verlan as a linguistic phenomenon. Some of these words have become part of standard French.

A few well known examples are:

  > 
  > 
  > 
  > 

Some Verlan words are metathesized more than once:

  >  >

Greek
In Greek, the present stem often consists of the root with a suffix of y (˰ in Greek). If the root ends in the vowel a or o, and the consonant n or r, the y exchanges position with the consonant and is written i:

 *cháryō > chaírō "I am glad" — echárē "he was glad"
 *phányō > phaínō "I reveal" — ephánē "he appeared"

For metathesis of vowel length, which occurs frequently in Attic and Ionic Greek, see quantitative metathesis.

Hebrew
In Hebrew the verb conjugation (binyan) hitpaēl undergoes metathesis if the first consonant of the root is an alveolar or postalveolar fricative. Namely, the pattern hiṯ1a22ē3 (where the numbers signify the root consonants) becomes hi1ta22ē3. Examples:

 No metathesis: root lbš  = hitlabbēš  ("he got dressed").
 Voiceless alveolar fricative: root skl  = histakkēl  ("he looked [at something]").
 Voiceless postalveolar fricative: root šdl  = hištaddēl  ("he made an effort").
 Voiced alveolar fricative: root zqn  = hizdaqqēn  ("he grew old"); with assimilation of the T of the conjugation.
 Voiceless alveolar affricate: root t͡slm  = hit͡stallēm  ("he had a photograph of him taken"); with assimilation (no longer audible) of the T of the conjugation.

Hebrew also features isolated historical examples of metathesis. For example, the words  keves and  kesev (meaning "lamb") both appear in the Torah.

Hungarian
In case of a narrow range of Hungarian nouns, metathesis of a h sound and a liquid consonant occurs in nominative case, but the original form is preserved in accusative and other suffixed forms:

  "chalice", but  (accusative),  (possessive),  (plural)
  "burden", but  (acc.),  (poss.),  (pl.)
  "flake", but  (acc.),  (poss.),  (pl.)

The other instances are  [intestinal] villus/fluff/fuzz/nap vs. bolyhok,  vs. molyhos down/pubescence [on plants], and the obsolete  animal's fetus (cf. vemhes "pregnant [animal]"). The first of them is often used in the regular form.

Japanese

 Small children commonly refer to kusuri "medicine" as sukuri.
 arata- "new" contrasts with atarashii "new".

The following are examples of argot used in the entertainment industry.

  for 
 The word for "sorry", gomen, is sometimes inverted to mengo (backslang).

Lakota

Malay (including Malaysian and Indonesian variants)

Metathesis from earlier protoform, though not so prevalent in Malay, can still be seen, as in the following:

 Proto-Malayo-Polynesian: *uʀsa >  "deer"
 Proto-Malayo-Polynesian: *qudip >  "alive"
 Proto-Malayo-Polynesian: *dilaq >  "tongue"
 Proto-Malayo-Polynesian: *laqia >  "ginger""

Loanwords can also be products of metathesis.

Navajo
In Navajo, verbs have (often multiple) morphemes prefixed onto the verb stem. These prefixes are added to the verb stem in a set order in a prefix positional template. Although prefixes are generally found in a specific position, some prefixes change order by the process of metathesis.

For example, prefix  (3i object pronoun) usually occurs before , as in

  "I'm starting to drive some kind of wheeled vehicle along" [ <  +  +  +  + ].

  "I'm in the act of driving some vehicle [into something] and getting stuck" [ <  <  +  +  +  +  + ]

instead of the expected * ( is reduced to ).

Proto-Indo-European
Metahesis has been used to explain the development of thorn clusters in Proto-Indo-European (PIE). It is hypothesised in the non-Anatolian and non-Tocharian branch, a coronal followed by a dorsal *TK first assibilated to *TsK, and thereafter underwent metathesis to *TsK, so *TK > *TsK > *KTs.

 PIE  "bear" (cf. Hittite ) >  >  (cf. Sanskrit , Ancient Greek ἄρκτος)
 PIE  "earth" (cf. Hittite ) → zero-grade  >  >  (cf. Sanskrit , Ancient Greek χθών)

Romanian
Similar to the French verlan is the Totoiana, a speech form spoken in the village of Totoi in Romania. It consists in the inversion of syllables of Romanian words in a way that results unintelligible for other Romanian speakers. Its origins or original purpose are unknown. Its current use is recreative.

Rotuman
The Rotuman language of Rotuman Island (a part of Fiji) uses metathesis as a part of normal grammatical structure by inverting the ultimate vowel with the immediately preceding consonant.

Slavic languages

Metathesis of liquid consonants is an important historical change during the development of the Slavic languages: a syllable-final liquid metathesized to become syllable-initial, therefore e.g. Polish  or Czech  vs. English .

A number of Proto-Indo-European roots indicate metathesis in Slavic forms when compared with other Indo-European languages:

 Proto-Indo-European  > Latin , German , English ,  - c.f. Slavic cognates, e.g. The divergence in meaning is attributed to the fact that the PIE root designated an enclosed area.
 Proto-Indo-European  > Proto-Germanic  "arm", Proto-Slavic  "shoulder"; Proto-Germanic  > German , English  "arm"; Proto-Slavic  > Russian  (rámya), Serbo-Croatian , Czech , Polish  "shoulder"

Other roots have diverged within the Slavic family:

 Proto-Indo-European  > Proto-Slavic  > Russian  (mgla), Polish , Czech , Slovak , Ukrainian  (imla), "mist". The English word is also cognate, as is the Sanskrit  (megha), hence Meghalaya, "abode of clouds".
Ukrainian  (vedmíd)

Spanish
Old Spanish showed occasional metathesis when phonemes not conforming to the usual euphonic constraints were joined. The Spanish name for Algeria (Argelia) is likely a metathesis of the Arabic name for the territory.

Lunfardo, an argot of Spanish from Buenos Aires, is fond of vesre, metathesis of syllables. The word  itself is an example:

  >  "back, backwards"

Gacería, an argot of Castile, incorporates metathesized words:

  > 

Some frequently heard pronunciations in Spanish display metathesis:

  > 
  > 
  >

Straits Salish languages 
In the Salishan languages Northern Straits and Klallam, metathesis is used as a grammatical device to indicate "actual" aspect. The actual aspect is most often translated into English as a be ... -ing progressive. The actual aspect is derived from the "nonactual" verb form by a CV → VC metathetic process (i.e., consonant metathesizes with vowel).
Examples from the Saanich (SENĆOŦEN) dialect of Northern Straits:

See Montler (1986,  1989,2015) and Thompson & Thompson (1969) for more information.

Swahili 
In Swahili, some foreign words can undergo metathesis during their importation. For instance, "American" becomes "mmarekani".

Telugu
From a comparative study of Dravidian vocabularies, one can observe that the retroflex consonants and the liquids of the alveolar series do not occur initially in common Dravidian etyma, but Telugu has words with these consonants at the initial position. It was shown that the etyma underwent a metathesis in Telugu, when the root word originally consisted of an initial vowel followed by one of the above consonants. When this pattern is followed by a consonantal derivative, metathesis has occurred in the phonemes of the root-syllable with the doubling of the suffix consonant (if it had been single); when a vowel derivative follows, metathesis has occurred in the phonemes of the root syllable attended by a contraction of the vowels of root and (derivative) suffix syllables. These statements and the resulting sequences of vowel contraction may be summed up as follows:

Type 1: V1C1-C² > C1V1-C²C²

Type 2: V1C1-V²- > C1V1-

Examples:

 lē = lēta "young, tender" < *eɭa
 rē = rēyi "night" < *ira
 rōlu "mortar" < oral < *ural

Turkish
Two types of metathesis are observed in Turkish. The examples given are from Anatolian Turkish, though the closely related Azerbaijani language is better known for its metathesis:

 Close type:
  =  "bridge"
  =  "ground"
  =  "hedgehog"
  =  "match"
  =  "neighbour"
  =  "nobody"
  =  "flag"
  =  "sour"
 Distant type:
  =  "bulgur"
  =  "loan"
  =  "curse"

Hindustani 
Like many other natural languages Urdu and Hindi also have metathesis like in this diachronic example:

Sanskrit  janma  > Urdu  and Hindi  janam  "Birth"

More examples
 Portuguese  became Urdu and Hindi  (girjā), meaning "church"

In popular culture
 Metathesis is described by the character Data in the episode "Hollow Pursuits" in the television series Star Trek: The Next Generation after Captain Picard accidentally addresses Lieutenant Barclay as "Mr. Broccoli".

See also
 Anagram
 Dyslexia
 Epenthesis
 Quantitative metathesis
 Spoonerism

Citations

General bibliography 
 Hume, E., & Seyfarth, S. (2019). "Metathesis". In M. Aronoff (ed.), Oxford Bibliographies in Linguistics. New York: Oxford University Press. .
 
 Montler, Timothy. (1986). An outline of the morphology and phonology of Saanich, North Straits Salish. Occasional Papers in Linguistics (No. 4). Missoula, MT: University of Montana Linguistics Laboratory. (Revised version of the author's PhD dissertation, University of Hawaii).
 
 Young, Robert W., & Morgan, William Sr. (1987). The Navajo language: A grammar and colloquial dictionary, (rev. ed.). Albuquerque: University of New Mexico Press.

External links
 Searchable database of metathesis: Ohio State University Dept. of Linguistics Metathesis Page
 Compare: "Development of the metathesis method in organic synthesis"—2005 Nobel Prize in Chemistry—metathesis process
 "Metathesis" in The Blackwell Companion to Phonology
 

Phonology
Speech error

nn:Metatese#Metatese i språk